Christina Patoski  (born 1948) is an American photographer, journalist and video artist. Patoski is known for her long-running project of photographing the holiday and religious displays in the yards of suburban American homes.

Her work is included in the collection of the Museum of Fine Arts Houston and the National Museum of American History.

Books
Merry Christmas America: A Front Yard View of the Holidays  1994.

References

Living people
1948 births
20th-century American photographers
21st-century American photographers
20th-century American women artists
21st-century American women artists